Ivan Lisutin (born February 23, 1987) is a Russian professional ice hockey goaltender who currently plays for HC '05 Banská Bystrica of the Slovak Extraliga (Slovak).

Lisutin has formerly played in the Kontinental Hockey League (KHL), notably playing in two stints with Torpedo Nizhny Novgorod in agreeing to a one-year deal on May 1, 2017.

References

External links

1987 births
Living people
Avtomobilist Yekaterinburg players
KHL Medveščak Zagreb players
Metallurg Magnitogorsk players
HC Neftekhimik Nizhnekamsk players
Torpedo Nizhny Novgorod players
HC Vityaz players
Russian ice hockey goaltenders